Sanikizhamai Saayangalam 5 Mani is a 2010 Tamil language crime thriller film written and directed by Ravi Bharathi, starring Sarath and Malaini. The film was shot entirely with Canon EOS 7D, a still camera. The film received mixed reviews.

Cast 
 Sarath as Sakthi
 Malini as Maha
 Meera Krishnan as Maha's mother
 Ravi Bharathi as Maha's father
Rathi Bala as "Kannaadi" Gopi 
Selvam
Malathi
Mogan as Inspector Aathi

Soundtrack
The music was composed by Xavier, his first film.
"Enge Pocho" - Haricharan
"Sa Sa Sunday" - Jai, Shardha
"Thirudugiraai" - Prasanna, Surmukhi Raman

Release 
In a review of the film by The Hindu, the reviewer wrote that "The film is bold, and has a fresh approach but lacks a compelling climax". Behindwoods wrote, "Overall, ‘Sanikizhamai Sayangalam 5 Mani’ has some brilliant flashes and it’s laudable that Ravi Bharathy has exercised his ability to narrate an exclusive tale. It is true that the film could have found an exclusive place in Tamil cinema if it had a tighter screenplay and strong performances but director Ravi Bharathy and his crew must be lauded for their effort to conceptualize a unique essay which makes the movie a decent watch." Sify wrote, "The trouble with the suspense laden plot is that it is slow and songs in flashback comes as a speed breaker. The story and screenplay lacks logic and just drags on to a predictable climax."

References

2010s Tamil-language films
2010 crime thriller films
2010 films
Indian crime thriller films